The 2014 Silverstone GP2 Series round was a pair of motor races held on 5 and 6 July 2014 at the Silverstone Circuit in Silverstone, United Kingdom as part of the GP2 Series. It is the fifth round of the 2014 season. The race weekend supported the 2014 British Grand Prix.

Classification

Qualifying

Feature race

Sprint race

See also 
 2014 British Grand Prix
 2014 Silverstone GP3 Series round

External links
 

Silverstone
GP2
Silverstone GP2 Series round